Refuge du Prariond is a refuge in the Alps. It's located 2,324 meters above sea level.

Mountain huts in the Alps
Mountain huts in France